The Stone Mountain Provincial Park is an area of  of mountain wilderness in the Canadian province of British Columbia. The park is part of the larger Muskwa-Kechika Management Area which includes the Northern Rocky Mountains Provincial Park, immediately south, and Kwadacha Wilderness Provincial Park. It and nearby Muncho Lake Provincial Park are accessed from the Alaska Highway, where it penetrates the Northern Rocky Mountains.

References

External links

Parks in the Canadian Rockies
Northern Interior of British Columbia
Provincial parks of British Columbia
Protected areas established in 1957
1957 establishments in British Columbia